The 1998–99 Botola is the 43rd season of the Moroccan Premier League. Raja Casablanca are the holders of the title.

References

Morocco 1998–99

Botola seasons
Morocco
Botola